Pa Modou Jagne (born 26 December 1989) is a Gambian professional footballer who plays as a defender for Swiss fifth-tier 2. Liga Interregional club FC Dietikon.

Club career

Sion
In July 2013, Jagne moved to FC Sion on a free transfer. He made his league debut for the club on 13 July 2013 in a 2–0 away defeat to Young Boys. He played all ninety minutes of the match. He scored his first league goal for the club on 9 March 2014 in a 3–2 home victory over FC Luzern. He was subbed on for Birama Ndoye at half-time and scored in the 72nd minute. His goal made the score 3–2 to Sion.

FC Zürich
In June 2017 he signed a two-year contract with Zürich. He made his league debut for the club on 23 July 2017 in a 2–0 away victory over Grasshopper Zürich. He played all ninety minutes of the match. He scored his first league goal for the club on 1 October 2017 in a 3–0 home victory over FC Lugano. He was subbed on for Michael Frey in the 83rd minute and scored just six minutes later. His goal, assisted by Raphael Dwamena, made the score 3–0 to Zürich.

Jagne's contract expired in the summer 2019. However, he returned to the club and signed a new contract on 4 September 2019 until the summer 2020. In July 2020 his contract was not renewed.

International goals
Scores and results list the Gambia's goal tally first.

International career
He played in the 2021 Africa cup of Nations, his national team's first continental tournament, where they made a sensational quarter-final.

Honours

Club
St. Gallen
Swiss Challenge League: 2011–12

Sion
Swiss Cup: 2014–15
Swiss Cup runner-up: 2016–17

FC Zürich
Swiss Cup: 2017–18

References

External links
 

1989 births
Living people
Sportspeople from Banjul
Gambian footballers
Association football midfielders
Gambia Ports Authority FC players
FC Wil players
FC St. Gallen players
FC Sion players
FC Zürich players
Swiss Super League players
Swiss Challenge League players
2. Liga Interregional players
The Gambia international footballers
2021 Africa Cup of Nations players
Gambian expatriate footballers
Gambian expatriate sportspeople in Switzerland
Expatriate footballers in Switzerland